The Nairn River, also known as the Mangatukurewa Creek is a river in the Chatham Islands of New Zealand. Located in the southwest of Chatham Island, it runs north to reach the coast close to the southern end of Petre Bay. The main settlement of the Chatham Islands, Waitangi, stands close to the mouth of the Nairn River.

References

Rivers of the Chatham Islands
Chatham Island